Acinetobacter bouvetii is a gram-negative, strictly aerobic bacterium from the genus Acinetobacter which was isolated from activated sludge. Acinetobacter bouvetii is named after the French microbiologist Philippe Bouvet.

References

External links
Type strain of Acinetobacter bouvetii at BacDive -  the Bacterial Diversity Metadatabase

Moraxellaceae
Bacteria described in 2003